The Sires' Produce Stakes is a Perth Racing Group 3  Thoroughbred horse race for two-year-olds, run at set weights, over a distance of 1400 metres at Ascot Racecourse, Perth, Western Australia in April. Total prizemoney is A$200,000.

History

Grade

1911–1978 -  Principal Race
1979–1990 -  Group 2
1991 onwards -  Group 3

Venue
 In 2005 and 2010 the race was run at Belmont Park Racecourse.

Winners

 2022 - Snowdome  
 2021 - Hoi An  
2020 - Watch Me Dance  
2019 - Tinsnip
2018 - Lordhelpmerun
2017 - Debellatio
2016 - Whispering Brook
2015 - Showy Chloe
2014 - Prentice
2013 - Camporella
2012 - Luke's Luck
2011 - Bliss Street
2010 - Motion Pictures
2009 - God Has Spoken
2008 - Brava Fortune
2007 - Roman Time
2006 - Paris Petard
2005 - Denmarket
2004 - Covertly
2003 - Diamond Dash
2002 - Hardrada
2001 - Miss Vandal
2000 - Simon Said
1999 - Paradise Park
1998 - Bomber Bill
1997 - Snooping
1996 - Clever Jev
1995 - Marooned Lady
1994 - Arabella
1993 - Starbaleta
1992 - Rapid Tripper
1991 - Time Frame
1990 - Pedantic
1989 - Send A Sign
1988 - Deluxe Model
1987 - Showy Gift
1986 - Sanhedrin's Pride
1985 - Just Begun
1984 - Don Remon
1983 - Shah-Anne
1982 - Corona Miss
1981 - Wild Side
1980 - Papermaker
1979 - Hakim Boy
1978 - Rare Sovereign
1977 - Rolera
1976 - Storm Star
1975 - Farranfore
1974 - Dawn Aptly
1973 - Our Pocket
1972 - Indian Law
1971 - Indian Shel
1970 - Red Crescent
1969 - Roman Hills
1968 - Hispano
1967 - Super Sam
1966 - Haze
1965 - Nanna Tale
1964 - Little Roderick
1963 - Son O' Minx
1962 - Nicopolis
1961 - Geike
1960 - Chestillion
1959 - Kuantan
1958 - Countess Blanche
1957 - Sanvista
1956 - Fairflow
1955 - Aldon Queen
1954 - Maniana
1953 - Queen Mark
1952 - Winker
1951 - Master Gordon
1950 - Beau Scot
1949 - Radiant Stream
1948 - Precedent
1947 - Westralian
1946 - Blue Stream
1945 - Flaming Monarch
1944 - New Hue
1943 - Kalamunda
1942 - Skyro
1941 - Ruby
1940 - Knight Brook
1939 - Loyalist
1938 - Gay Prince
1937 - Jungle Lady
1936 - Jongleur
1935 - First Consul
1934 - Hyperion
1933 - D'Artagnan
1932 - Riveret
1931 - Jolly Fair
1930 - Shining Colours
1929 - Lord Beggar
1928 - Dawn Of Youth
1927 - Ferric
1926 - Maple
1925 - Pica Pica
1924 - Neatfoot
1923 - Flimsy
1922 - Landon
1921 - Poondarra
1920 - Jolly Cosy
1919 - Eurythmic
1918 - Eudios
1917 - Ventrim
1916 - Yandil
1915 - Welkin Queen
1914 - Irish Knight
1913 - Pilbarra
1912 - Roserial
1911 - Florabel

See also

 List of Australian Group races
 Group races

Notes

Horse races in Australia
Sport in Perth, Western Australia